Kimberly Carolina de León Girón (born 29 August 1989) is a Guatemalan footballer who plays as a defender for the Guatemala women's national team.

International career
De León capped for Guatemala at senior level during two CONCACAF Women's Championship editions (2010 and 2014), the 2010 Central American and Caribbean Games, the 2012 CONCACAF Women's Olympic Qualifying Tournament (and its qualification) and the 2013 Central American Games.

References

1989 births
Living people
Guatemalan women's footballers
Guatemala women's international footballers
Women's association football defenders
Central American Games bronze medalists for Guatemala
Central American Games medalists in football